Nitric oxide associated 1 is a protein in humans that is encoded by the NOA1 gene.

References

Further reading 

Genes on human chromosome 4